Walter William Law (November 13, 1837 – January 17, 1924) was a businessman and the founder of the 8,000-person village of Briarcliff Manor, New York. He was a vice president of furniture and carpet retailer W. & J. Sloane, and later founded the Briarcliff Lodge, the Briarcliff Table Water Company, Briarcliff Farms, and the Briarcliff Greenhouses. He founded or assisted in establishing several schools, churches, and parks in the village, and rebuilt its train station in 1906. In the early 1900s, Walter Law was the largest individual landholder in Westchester County.

Walter Law was born in Kidderminster, England, and was one of ten children of a carpet dealer. He relocated to the United States in 1859, where he lived until his death. Throughout his life, he was employed at various places, including at W. & J. Sloane, where he worked for 24 years. After retiring to a house on Scarborough Road in the small community of Whitson's Corners, New York, he developed the surrounding farmland into a suburban village. Law died in 1924 in Summerville, South Carolina, during rest cure treatment.

Early life 

Walter Law was born on November 13, 1837, in the English town of Kidderminster. He was one of ten children born to John and Elizabeth Bird Law, who were strict Nonconformists. His father sold carpets and dry goods; at the time, Kidderminster was a center of carpet manufacturing in Britain. Law was educated in private schools in Kidderminster; however, he left school and began working as a cash boy for a draper at the age of fourteen. Shortly after the United Kingdom's election of 1859, the Law family left Kidderminster, many to Australia. That year, Law moved to the United States, having gained an interest in the US after reading about it. He left England with letters of introduction written by his father, which were addressed to friends in the American carpet business; he also had enough money to last for about two weeks. He arrived in New York City on January 22, 1860.

Career 
Law originally found a job as a traveling carpet salesman. He continued until he discovered that his employer was misrepresenting domestic rugs as being imported and was also charging premium prices. His next employer, an outfitter of steamships and hotels, went out of business in the 1860s, when the American Civil War affected the business. Law struggled through unemployment, and even while working, pay was low. At one point, Law was employed at a store and was making eight dollars a week.

Later on, Law contacted William Sloane, head of W. & J. Sloane. Sloane hired him more out of kindness than need for employees. In 1866, at the age of 29, Law began work under Sloane with wages of $1 a day. After four years of employment, Walter Law became a partner in the company and later became a trustee for life. Originally Law mostly worked in mostly retail, but with the Civil War, wholesale demands increased, and Law's time spent working in wholesale increased until he became devoted to it exclusively.

Law first came to Yonkers due to him marketing the products of the Alexander Smith & Sons Carpet Company in Yonkers for the manufacture of moquette carpets. Walter Law increased the business of Sloane's wholesale department by securing their account; he eventually became a stockholder and member of the Yonkers company's board of directors. Law and his wife moved to Hillcrest, at 354 Palisade Avenue in Yonkers, making it easier for him to service the Smith account. He later became a vice president of W. & J. Sloane, and also joined its board of directors.

Briarcliff Manor developments 

In 1890, Walter Law began purchasing property in the present-day village of Briarcliff Manor. In 1898, Law retired from W. & J. Sloane and began devoting his time to his farming. He built an estate, the Manor House, on Scarborough Road in Briarcliff Manor. He later purchased more land, acquiring 5,000 acres by 1900, including land in Yorktown, Millwood, Pound Ridge, and Glenville, Connecticut. Law's farm began with rough farmland, a few cattle, and little knowledge of farming, but it eventually grew. At the farm's peak, Law had 500 workers caring for more than 1,000 cattle, 500 pigs, 4,000 chickens, Thoroughbred horses, pheasants, peacocks and sheep. Law believed that farming can pay off if it utilized scientific principles, and that the farm should find the best markets and hold them by producing the best products.

Around the same time, he established the Briarcliff Table Water Company and the Briarcliff Greenhouses. The water company sold its products in five cities, and owned  wells. Every night, his milk, cream, butter and kumyss was sent to New York City on the New York and Putnam Railroad. As many as 8,000 roses were shipped from Briarcliff Greenhouses daily, most of them to New York City. In 1902, Law built the Briarcliff Lodge on the highest point of his estate; it was the first hotel in Westchester County.

Law also developed the village, establishing schools, churches, and parks. He also built Dysart House as a guest house in 1897, named after Dysart House in Scotland. By 1902, Law had invested $2.5 million ($ in ) in the village. In 1906, he replaced Briarcliff Manor's railroad station with the present-day public library. His employees at Briarcliff Farms moved into the village in its early years, and Law held some of their mortgages. At the time, New York State required a population density of at least 300 per square mile for incorporation as a village. A proposition was presented to the supervisors of Mount Pleasant and Ossining on October 8, 1902; it requested that the area, which had 640 acres with a population of 381, be incorporated as the Village of Briarcliff Manor. The village was incorporated on November 21, 1902. At the time, Law owned all but two small parcels of the village, and he employed 100 of its residents. Law largely developed his Briarcliff Manor property as a business corporation until 1907, when he purchased  for Briarcliff Farms in Pine Plains, New York; he then began developing his properties for houses, churches, and schools instead. In 1909, Law formed the Briarcliff Lodge Association to run the hotel, and the Briarcliff Realty Company to sell the original Briarcliff Farms property. His son, Henry, presided over the realty company until 1936. In 1908, during the Briarcliff Manor-sponsored First American International Road Race, Law donated and presented the Briarcliff Trophy, valued at over $10,000 ($ in ). In 1918, Walter Law sold his Briarcliff Farms land in Pine Plains.

Later life and death 

Walter Law died in Summerville, South Carolina, on January 17, 1924. He had gone alone to Summerville for rest cure treatment. After the news of his death spread, Law's son, Henry, left for Summerville. Law's funeral was held at the Briarcliff Congregational Church three days later. He was buried with his wife and two of his children in Woodlawn Cemetery in New York City.

On February 1, 1924, Law's will was filed with county surrogate George A. Slater in White Plains. His estate was approximately $5 million, the majority of which was divided equally between his children. They also each received 25 shares of the Alexander Smith and Sons Carpet company's stock and scrip and 250 shares of the Nairn Linoleum Company. Law's friends, servants, and employees received from $500 to $5,000. He also bequeathed $13,500 to his longtime nurse and secretary Ida Z. Thompson. Law's son Henry inherited the family's Briarcliff Manor house, and Law's daughter Georgia inherited the family's summer house, formerly the C.H. Burnham house, in Jefferson, New Hampshire.

Family and personal life 

Law had three sons and four daughters with his wife, Georgianna Hitt (née Ransom) Law, whom he married on January 4, 1866, at 152 Second Avenue in New York City. She lived from 1839 to September 18, 1910. Their children were Georgia "Georgie" R. Penman (born November 10, 1866), Carrie Law-Fotterall (b. September 10, 1869), Walter W. Law Jr. (b. July 15, 1871), Edith Bird Brockelman (b. April 10, 1874), Arthur Law (January 11, 1876 – January 23, 1877), Henry Herbert Law (February 28, 1878 – November 18, 1936), and Martha Janet Macey (b. March 10, 1880).

During their life at Briarcliff Manor, Law owned the Manor House on Scarborough Road. Law later built houses for Henry, Walter Jr., and Edith on the Briarcliff Lodge property on Scarborough Road. The three houses were named Hillcrest, Six Gables, and Mt. Vernon, and all three still stand.

Walter Law was a friend of Andrew Carnegie, who described Law as always having an interest in reading and writing. When he found a phrase to be clever or intriguing, Law would document it for further use. Carnegie wrote that Law often made new friends, and had an attractive personality. Law's personal interest was largely in his personal library of 7,000 volumes, which he collected for more than forty years. His library was said to contain many works of classic literature and history; on a vacation to Europe, Law mostly spent time in Greece visiting historic sites. He was also a member of the Alpine Club, Aldine Association, the American Fine Arts Society, Ardsley Casino (now Ardsley Country Club), the Astronomical Society of the Pacific, New York's Century Association, the Metropolitan Museum of Art, the Players, and Sleepy Hollow Country Club. Law and his wife were on the Aqueduct Guard Citizens' Committee, a committee tasked with providing for the needs of the New York Guard troops who were protecting the Old Croton Aqueduct during World War I. In 1892, Law also received an honorary Master of Arts degree in agriculture from Yale University.

See also 
 History of Briarcliff Manor

Notes

References

External links 

1837 births
1924 deaths
American city founders
Briarcliff Manor, New York
Burials at Woodlawn Cemetery (Bronx, New York)
Businesspeople from New York (state)
English emigrants to the United States
People from Briarcliff Manor, New York
People from Kidderminster
People from Yonkers, New York
Farmers from New York (state)
Philanthropists from New York (state)